The Bearden Water Works are a historic public water works facility in Bearden, Arkansas, United States.  It is located behind Bearden's city hall, at the corner of North 2nd Street and North Cedar Street, and consists of a water tower, two well houses, and a concrete holding tank.  The facility was funded in 1936 by the Public Works Administration (PWA), and is the only PWA-built water works left in the county.

The water works was listed on the National Register of Historic Places in 2006.

See also
National Register of Historic Places listings in Ouachita County, Arkansas

References

Water towers on the National Register of Historic Places in Arkansas
Infrastructure completed in 1936
National Register of Historic Places in Ouachita County, Arkansas
1936 establishments in Arkansas
Water supply infrastructure in Arkansas
Water supply infrastructure on the National Register of Historic Places
Works Progress Administration in Arkansas